Lipienice may refer to the following places in Poland:
 Lipienice, Masovian Voivodeship
 Lipienice, Pomeranian Voivodeship